Eupithecia vicina is a moth in the family Geometridae. It is found in Mongolia.

References

Moths described in 1989
vicina
Moths of Asia